Künzell is a municipality in the district of Fulda, in Hesse, Germany. It is situated 3 km east of Fulda. It is twinned with the English village of Rustington.

The subdivisions are: Künzell/Bachrain, Pilgerzell, Engelhelms, Dirlos (with Loheland), Dietershausen, Keulos, Wissels and Dassen.

History 

In 743 a monk named Chindolf settled there in a cella. The place was named Chindecella or Kindecella.

References

Fulda (district)